Loxospora septata is a species of crustose lichen in the family Sarrameanaceae. It was first formally described as a new species in 1991 by Harrie Sipman and André Aptroot as Sarrameana septata The type was collected in Mt. Gahavisuki Provincial Park, in the Eastern Highlands Province of Papua New Guinea. Gintaras Kantvilas transferred the taxon to  Loxospora in 2000, as he thought several characteristics of the lichen made it a better fit for this genus. These include: the presence of thamnolic acid in the thallus, the structure of the apothecia, the sparse branching of the paraphyses, and the absence of oil droplets in the hymenium.

References

Lecanoromycetes
Lichen species
Lichens described in 1991
Taxa named by André Aptroot
Lichens of New Guinea
Taxa named by Harrie Sipman